Sphingobacterium paludis is a Gram-negative bacterium from the genus of Sphingobacterium which has been isolated from soil from the Xixi wetland in China.

References

Sphingobacteriia
Bacteria described in 2014